Hewitt Bernard,  (1825 – 24 February 1893) was a Canadian lawyer, militia officer, editor, and civil servant.

Life and career 
Bernard was born in Spanish Town, Jamaica. He was educated in Bath, England, and practiced law education in Jamaica until the death of his father in 1850. He came to Canada in 1851 to establish himself in law practice and settled in Barrie, Upper Canada, where he became part of local society. In 1854, he brought his mother and sister Agnes to live with him. About that time, he joined the local militia and eventually gained the rank of lieutenant-colonel. Bernard was a Freemason of Ionic Lodge, No. 25 (Ontario) of Toronto, resigning when he left to work in Quebec in 1859.

Bernard was a successful lawyer and co-editor of the Upper Canada Law Journal when he became the private secretary of Attorney General John A. Macdonald in 1857. He soon became chief clerk, and he was the recording secretary at the Charlottetown Conference in 1864.

In February 1867, Bernard's sister Agnes married John A. Macdonald, who became the Prime Minister of Canada a few months later. Bernard was a very good friend of Macdonald before he became Macdonald's brother-in-law.

After Confederation, Bernard served as the private secretary to the
 Prime Minister between 1867 and 1873.  He was also the Deputy Minister of Justice from 1868 to 1876. Bernard was succeeded in that position by Zebulon Aiton Lash.

Some historians, such as P. B. Waite, consider Bernard to be a Father of Confederation. In 1872, he was made a Companion of the Order of St Michael and St George.

References

External links 
 
 Ontario Historical Plaques - Hewitt Bernard
 Department of Justice Canada - Justice in the 60s - The 1860s (includes image of Hewitt Bernard)

1825 births
1893 deaths
19th-century Canadian lawyers
19th-century Canadian civil servants
Jamaican people of English descent
Emigrants from British Jamaica to Canada
Canadian newspaper editors
Canadian Companions of the Order of St Michael and St George
19th-century Canadian journalists
Canadian male journalists
19th-century male writers
People from Spanish Town
Colony of Jamaica people
Canadian Freemasons
Burials at Beechwood Cemetery (Ottawa)
19th-century Jamaican lawyers